Yevgeny Moskvichev is a Russian politician who is a member of the State Duma for the United Russia party in the 7th State Duma of the Russian Federation. He is the head of the committee on transport and construction.

References 

Sixth convocation members of the State Duma (Russian Federation)
Seventh convocation members of the State Duma (Russian Federation)
21st-century Russian politicians
Living people
Year of birth missing (living people)
United Russia politicians
Eighth convocation members of the State Duma (Russian Federation)